Mallat is a surname. Notable people with the surname include:

Chibli Mallat (born 1960), Lebanese human rights lawyer
Jean-Yves Mallat (born 1962), Lebanese sprinter
Stéphane Mallat (born 1961), French mathematician
Wajdi Mallat (1919–2010), Lebanese jurist, politician, and writer